Dejanira (minor planet designation: 157 Dejanira) is a main belt asteroid that was discovered by Alphonse Borrelly on 1 December 1875, and named after the warlike princess Deianira in Greek mythology (Δηιάνειρα in Greek). The Dejanira family of asteroids is named after it.

Photometric observations of this asteroid were made in early 2009 at the Organ Mesa Observatory in Las Cruces, New Mexico. The resulting light curve shows a synodic rotation period of 15.825 ± 0.001 hours.

References

External links 
 Lightcurve plot of 157 Dejanira, Palmer Divide Observatory, B. D. Warner (2005)
 Asteroid Lightcurve Database (LCDB), query form (info )
 Dictionary of Minor Planet Names, Google books
 Asteroids and comets rotation curves, CdR – Observatoire de Genève, Raoul Behrend
 Discovery Circumstances: Numbered Minor Planets (1)-(5000) – Minor Planet Center
 
 

000157
000157
Discoveries by Alphonse Borrelly
Named minor planets
18751201